The 1932 United States presidential election in Colorado took place on November 8, 1932, as part of the 1932 United States presidential election. State voters chose six representatives, or electors, to the Electoral College, who voted for president and vice president.

Colorado was won by Governor Franklin D. Roosevelt (D–New York), running with Speaker John Nance Garner, with 54.81 percent of the popular vote, against incumbent President Herbert Hoover (R–California), running with Vice President Charles Curtis, with 41.43% of the popular vote. As of the 2020 presidential election, this is the last occasion when Elbert County voted for a Democratic presidential candidate. Colorado voted 4.4% to the right of the nation in this election. This marks the last presidential election until 1992 in which an incumbent Republican would lose Colorado in a re-election bid, along with a non-incumbent Democrat subsequently winning the state.

Results

Results by county

References

Colorado
1932
1932 Colorado elections